William IV (1765–1837) was King of the United Kingdom of Great Britain and Ireland and of Hanover from 1830 to 1837.

William IV may also refer to:
 William IV, Duke of Aquitaine (937–994)
 William IV of Provence (died 1030)
 William IV of Weimar or William, Margrave of Meissen (died 1062)
 William IV of Montpellier (r. 1058–1068)
 William IV, Count of Toulouse (c. 1040–1094)
 William IV, Marquis of Montferrat (c. 1030–1100)
 William IV, Count of Nevers (c. 1130–1168)
 William IV of Forcalquier (1130–1208)
 William IV of Saint Omer (fl. 1157–1191)
 William IV, Count of Ponthieu (1179–1221)
 William IV, Count of Jülich (c. 1210–1278)
 William IV, Lord of Douglas (died 1333)
 William IV of Holland or William II, Count of Hainaut (1307–1345)
 William IV of Hainault or William II, Duke of Bavaria (1365–1417)
 William IV, Lord of Egmont (1412–1483)
 William IV, Duke of Brunswick-Lüneburg (c. 1425–1503)
 William IV, Duke of Jülich-Berg (1455–1511)
 William IV, Princely count of Henneberg-Schleusingen (1478–1559)
 William IV, Duke of Bavaria (1493–1550)
 William IV, Landgrave of Hesse-Kassel (1532–1592)
 William IV, Prince of Orange (1711–1751)
 William IV, Grand Duke of Luxembourg (1852–1912)